Salih Mahdi Ammash (1924 – 30 January 1985) was an Iraqi historian, writer, author, poet and Iraqi Regional Branch politician and Iraqi army officer who sat on the Regional Command from 1963 to 1971.

Life
He was born into a peasant family in Baghdad, 1924. Ammash attended the Baghdad Military College and the Baghdad Staff College. He joined the Ba'ath Party in 1952 and become one of the first military Ba'athists in the Iraqi Regional Branch. Ammash was a member of the Free Officers Movement which toppled the Iraqi monarchy.

Ammash was elected to the Regional Command for three separate terms. He also served as one of the vice presidents of Ahmed Hassan al-Bakr.

In 1975, Ammash became the first ambassador of Iraq to Finland.  In January 1985, while still in Helsinki, he suddenly became ill and died, leading to suspicions that he was poisoned on the orders of Iraqi leader Saddam Hussein.

His daughter Huda became the first and only female member of the Regional Command on 18 May 2001.

References
Citations

Sources

1924 births
1985 deaths
People from Baghdad
Vice presidents of Iraq
Foreign ministers of Iraq
Interior ministers of Iraq
Defence ministers of Iraq
Members of the Regional Command of the Arab Socialist Ba'ath Party – Iraq Region
Assassinated Iraqi politicians
Iraqi military personnel
Iraqi Sunni Muslims
Assassinations in Finland
Iraqi Military Academy alumni